KMOG (1420 AM, "Rim Country Radio") is a radio station licensed to serve Payson, Arizona, United States. The station is owned by Farrell Enterprises LLC. It airs a full-service country music format.

History
The station was assigned the KMOG call letters by the Federal Communications Commission on March 15, 1982. It was bought by Michael Farrell in 1989.

Its programming includes country music, news, local talk, and religious programs.
 Original Developers Neil Monaco, Hall Mayo and Willard Taylor

References

External links
 KMOG official website

Country radio stations in the United States
MOG
Mass media in Gila County, Arizona